Mariann Aalda is an American television, stage, film actress, performance artist, and stand-up comic.

Career
Aalda is best known for her work in television as one of the first African-American daytime soap opera heroines, playing DiDi Bannister-Stoner on ABC's The Edge of Night from 1981 until the show's cancellation in 1984. For many years before that she was a writer-performer with the sketch comedy troupe Off Center Theatre in New York, and toured with the Boston-based improv group, The Proposition, along with notable animation voice actor and director, Charlie Adler. Later, she appeared on the CBS show Guiding Light.  She also had regular roles on the CBS sitcom The Royal Family, as the daughter of Redd Foxx and Della Reese, and the HBO series 1st & Ten, as the wife of O. J. Simpson's character.

Aalda also achieved notoriety recurring on the CBS sitcom Designing Women, as Anthony's yuppie-from-hell girlfriend, Lita Ford, and on the NBC soap opera Sunset Beach as the tragically disfigured Lena Hart. She co-hosted the lifestyle show Designs for Living on the USA Network and was a reporter for the magazine show NOW! on WNBC in New York. Her numerous guest-star roles are mostly sitcoms.

Aalda has also appeared in movies, co-starring in the urban cult film Class Act as rapper Kid's clueless mom, and as Coach Harrison in Nobody's Perfect. She was a featured player in Beaches and Pretty Woman, directed by Garry Marshall and The Wiz, directed by Sidney Lumet.

She is a leader in the positive aging movement, with a TEDx Talk and AARP recognition as an "Age Disruptor". She is a prolific podcast guest on the topic of shameless aging. She is resident Age Anarchist for Women of Color Unite (WOCU), a 5000-plus member advocacy group for women of color working both above and below the line in the entertainment industry. She also delivers her message on positive aging as a standup comedian and with her solo "existential comedy" show, Getting Old Is a Bitch...But I'm Gonna Wrestle That Bitch to the Ground!, which broke a 30-year box office record at the 2019 National Black Theatre Festival in Winston-Salem, North Carolina.

Film and television credits

References

External links
 
 

1940s births
Living people
20th-century American actresses
21st-century American actresses
Southern Illinois University alumni
American soap opera actresses
Actresses from Chicago
African-American actresses
American television actresses
American film actresses
American stage actresses
20th-century African-American women
20th-century African-American people
21st-century African-American women
21st-century African-American people